"Dance Apocalyptic" is a song by Janelle Monáe, issued as the second single from her second studio album, The Electric Lady. The song was co-written with Charles Joseph II and Nathaniel Irvin III, and Monae, Chuck Lightning and Nate "Rocket" Wonder providing production. "Dance Apocalyptic" is a dance-pop song with elements of hip-hop, doo-wop, rock, Motown, and new wave. The song is built on kick-drums, keyboards, an electric guitar, scratching and synthesizers. Lyrically, the song is about dancing and liberation.

"Dance Apocalyptic" received widespread positive reviews, with critics noting its catchiness and feel-good lyrics.

Composition and lyrics
"Dance Apocalyptic" is a dance-pop, new wave rock, doo-wop, Motown and hip-hop song.

Reception
Keith Murphy of Vibe praised the song, calling it an "infectious rave-up" and "the soundtrack to endless summer cookouts".

Music video

The music video was directed by Wendy Morgan.

Live performances
On September 9, 2013, Monáe performed the song on the Late Show with David Letterman. She then performed the song (along with "Electric Lady") on Saturday Night Live on October 26.

Track listing

Charts

References

External links
 

2013 singles
Bad Boy Records singles
Janelle Monáe songs
Songs written by Janelle Monáe
2013 songs
Rock-and-roll songs
American new wave songs